Soilbleed Redux is the third album EP release by Dutch Aggrotech band, Grendel. It was released in Europe through NoiTekk Records on May 12, 2006.

The original Soilbleed EP, was re-released as Redux due to copyright issues over the use of their cover of Zombie Nation's Kernkraft 400 (called Zombienation on the EP).

Track listing

References

2006 EPs
Grendel (band) albums